Hang On to Each Other is the third EP by Thee Silver Mt. Zion Memorial Orchestra. The EP was released on April 29, 2014, on Constellation.

The EP contains two electronic/dance remixes of "Hang On to Each Other" from Horses in the Sky and features vocals by Ariel Engle of AroarA.

Track listing

References

2014 EPs
Thee Silver Mt. Zion albums
Constellation Records (Canada) EPs